London has contributed much to the history and development of popular music, from the British Rock revolution of the 1960s to the punk rock explosion of the 1970s to the underground electronic and dance sounds of recent years. The city is often cited as the birthplace of classic rock and the popular music industry. Several genres of rock and pop emerged from London's music scene including British rhythm and blues, psychedelia, mod, prog, glam, hard rock and punk rock. This page includes bands formed and based in London. Below is a list of music artists and bands from London. These are separated by genre. For Drum and Bass and UK Funky House, there are separate entries on Wikipedia.

Pop

Adele
Zak Abel
Adam Ant
All Saints
Another Level
Bananarama
Breathe
Chad and Jeremy
Chas & Dave
Childhood
Coldplay
Phil Collins
Culture Club
The Dream Academy
East 17
David Essex
Adam Faith
Climie Fisher
Five (stylised as 5ive)
Five Star
Samantha Fox
Nick Gilder
Girls Aloud
Haircut 100
Hot Chocolate
Murray Head
Elton John
Jonathan King
Katch 22
Level 42
Leona Lewis
Liberty X
Dua Lipa
Laurie London
George Michael
Hayley Mills
Matt Monro
Naked Eyes
The New Vaudeville Band
One Direction
Paintbox
Peter and Gordon
Cliff Richard (born in India)
Julie Rogers
The Rubettes
Hurricane Smith
Spandau Ballet
Spice Girls
Steps
The Style Council
The Tourists
Wham!
Wang Chung
Jessie Ware
Kim Wilde
Zola Blood

Rock

AC/DC (Formed in 1973 in Sydney, Australia, they were largely based in London from 1976) 
Ace
After the Fire
America (members from America, band formed in London)
The Animals (originally formed in Newcastle in 1962, relocated to London in 1964)
Argent
Asia
Atomic Rooster
The Beatles (formed in Liverpool in 1960, relocated to London in 1963, helped establish the city's early rock sound)
David Bowie
The Crazy World Of Arthur Brown
Bad Company
The Blockheads (also known as Ian Dury & The Blockheads)
The Boomtown Rats (originally formed in Dublin in 1975, relocated to London in 1976)
Bush
Dave Clark Five
Cream
Curved Air
Cutting Crew
Deep Purple
Derek And The Dominos (with American members)
Dire Straits
Doctor And The Medics
Emerson, Lake & Palmer
Faces
Fairport Convention
Foghat
Foreigner (partly formed in London, founded by English musicians with American members) 
Marianne Faithfull
Fleetwood Mac (with American members)
Free
Genesis
The Groundhogs
Gryphon
Hawkwind
The Honeycombs
Iron Maiden
The Jeff Beck Group
Jethro Tull (originally formed in Blackpool in 1967 and relocated to London the same year)
The Jimi Hendrix Experience (English-American band) 
King Crimson
The Kinks
Led Zeppelin
Manfred Mann
Marillion
John Mayall & the Bluesbreakers
The Moody Blues (formed in Birmingham in 1964, based in London)
Motorhead
Mott The Hoople (formed in Hereford in 1969, based in London)
Mud
The Outfield
The Alan Parsons Project
The Kut
Pink Fairies
Pink Floyd
The Police
The Pretenders (English-American rock band, Chrissie Hynde born in Akron, Ohio)
Pretty Things
Procol Harum
The Quireboys
Queen
The Rolling Stones
Skunk Anansie
Small Faces
Status Quo
Strawbs
Squeeze
Rainbow
Rod Stewart
Roxy Music
The Shadows
Slash (born in London)
Supertramp
The Sweet (also known as Sweet) 
T. Rex
Thin Lizzy (originally formed in Dublin in 1969, relocated to London in 1970)
Tom Robinson Band
UFO
Whitesnake
Paul Weller
The Who
The Yardbirds
Yes
Young Guns
The Zombies

Famous London-born or -based guitarists

Jeff Beck (member of The Yardbirds, Beck was the founder of the London rock band, The Jeff Beck Group)
Ritchie Blackmore (grew up in Heston, Blackmore was a London-based session guitarist and co-founder and lead guitarist of the rock bands Deep Purple and Rainbow)
Marc Bolan (founding member of the London band, T. Rex and pioneer of the glam rock movement)
David Bowie (guitarist, singer-songwriter and pioneer of the glam rock and punk movements)
Eric Clapton (member of the London rock bands Cream, The Yardbirds and Derek And The Dominos)
Ray Davies (lead guitarist of the London rock band, The Kinks)
Peter Frampton (Guitarist, singer and songwriter born in London)
David Gilmour (lead guitarist of Pink Floyd, born in Cambridge)
Peter Green (blues guitarist born in London and co-founder of London band, Fleetwood Mac)
Steve Hackett (lead guitarist of Genesis from 1971-1977)
Jimi Hendrix (born in Seattle, career took off in London and he founded the London-based rock band, The Jimi Hendrix Experience)
Steve Howe (lead guitarist of the London progressive rock band, Yes)
Mick Jones (lead guitarist of the London punk band, The Clash)
Mick Jones (founder and lead guitarist of the rock band, Foreigner)
Steve Jones (lead guitarist of the London punk band, The Sex Pistols)
Mark Knopfler (lead guitarist of London rock band, Dire Straits)
Paul Kossoff (lead guitarist of the London hard rock band, Free)
Hank Marvin (lead guitarist of the London rock band, The Shadows)
Brian May (lead guitarist and founding member of London rock band, Queen)
Jimmy Page (London born and based guitarist and member of London blues rock group, The Yardbirds and founding member of the rock band, Led Zeppelin)
Andy Powell (Guitarist and founder of 70's hard rock band, Wishbone Ash)
Slash (lead guitarist of American rock band, Guns 'N' Roses, born in London)
Steve Marriott (London born and based guitarist of rock bands Small Faces and Humble Pie)
Keith Richards (lead guitarist of London rock band, The Rolling Stones)
Mike Rutherford (guitarist and founding member of the London rock band, Genesis)
Pete Townshend (lead guitarist of London rock band, The Who)
Paul Weller (guitarist and founding member of the bands, The Jam and the Style Council)
Ronnie Wood (member of The Rolling Stones, The Faces and the Jeff Beck Group)

Alternative rock

Antlered Man
Bastille
Big Audio Dynamite
The Big Moon
Bloc Party
The Bluetones
Blur
Kate Bush
Elvis Costello
Dodgy
Elastica
The Escape Club
Fightstar
The Fixx
Florence and the Machine
Gay Dad
Ian Gomm
Jesus Jones
JoBoxers
Klaxons
Kula Shaker
The Libertines
Miranda Sex Garden
Gary Numan
Placebo
The Psychedelic Furs
Razorlight
Saint Etienne
Shakespears Sister
Sleeper
Suede
Talk Talk
Then Jerico
White Lies
Wolf Alice
Yuck

Punk & ska

Amazulu
Bad Manners
The Belle Stars
Billy Idol
Bow Wow Wow
The Clash
The Damned
Generation X
The Jam
Killing Joke
Madness
The Passions
Public Image Ltd
The Ruts
Sex Pistols
Sham 69
Sigue Sigue Sputnik
Siouxsie and the Banshees
The Slits
The Stranglers
The The
Transvision Vamp
Towers of London
Toyah
U.K. Subs
Jah Wobble
X-Ray Spex

Metal

DragonForce
Gillan
Iron Maiden
Samson
Thunder
Uriah Heep

R&B, soul & reggae

Adele
Architechs
Aswad
Black Slate
Brand New Heavies
Alexandra Burke
Des'ree
The Foundations
Eruption
Estelle
Eternal
Paloma Faith
Gabrielle
Eddy Grant (born in Guyana raised in London)
Janet Kay
Jean Adebambo
Junior
Heartless Crew
Hot Chocolate
Dee C Lee
C.J. Lewis
Loose Ends
Louisa Marks
Mis-Teeq
Moko
Maxi Priest
Billy Ocean
Sade
Seal
Smiley Culture
Soul II Soul
Dusty Springfield
Sugababes
Amy Winehouse

Dance

Basement Jaxx
The Beloved
Clean Bandit
Coldcut
DJ Luck & MC Neat
Dreadzone
Faithless
Fatboy Slim
Jess Glynne
Gonzalez
The Grid
Groove Armada
Jamiroquai
The KLF
Leftfield
M.A.R.R.S.
Morcheeba
Olive
The Orb
Real Lies
Rudimental
SL2
So Solid Crew
Soho
Sonique
Undercover

Rap

AJ Tracey
Cookie Crew
Devilman (D-E-Velopment)
Dizzee Rascal
Ghetts
Giggs
JME
Lethal Bizzle
London Posse
MF Doom
Monie Love
Nadia Rose
Paigey Cakey
Plan B
Professor Green
Roll Deep
Roots Manuva
Skepta
Slick Rick
Stormzy
Sway
Tinie Tempah
Wee Papa Girl Rappers
Wretch 32
Wiley

Folk and singer-songwriter

Martin Briley
Albert Hammond
Elton John
Kirsty MacColl
Mumford & Sons
Noah and the Whale
Skinny Lister
Bear's Den
Sandy Denny

House and electronic
Alunageorge
Art of Trance
Basement Jaxx
Bomb The Bass
Disclosure
Maya Jane Coles 
Sounds from the Ground
S-Express
The Orb
Mat Zo

Synth-pop

Art of Noise
Belouis Some
Blancmange
Bronski Beat
The Buggles
Classix Nouveaux
The Communards
Thomas Dolby
Eighth Wonder
Erasure
Eurythmics
Fad Gadget
Frankmusik
Freeez
Goldfrapp
Go West
Haysi Fantayzee
Hot Chip
Landscape
La Roux
M
New Musik
Gary Numan
Paul Hardcastle
Imagination
Japan
Pet Shop Boys
Tubeway Army
Ultravox
Visage
Years & Years

References

Further reading
 

London
London-related lists
Artists and bands